Zinc finger protein 23 is a protein that in humans is encoded by the ZNF23 gene.

References

Further reading